Raoul Retzer (1919–1974) was an Austrian actor. Retzer was a prolific film actor appearing in more than a hundred and forty productions between 1952 and 1975 generally in small or supporting roles. He appeared in the 1955 film The Last Ten Days.

Selected filmography

 Ideal Woman Sought (1952) - Gigantino
 The Mine Foreman (1952) - Blasius, Hausdiener
 Heute nacht passiert's (1953)
 Ein tolles Früchtchen (1953)
 The Sweetest Fruits (1954) - Brezo
 Kaisermanöver (1954)
 Verliebte Leute (1954)
 The Blue Danube (1955) - Exzellenz mit Fes
 Marriage Sanitarium (1955) - Herr Kunz
 The Last Ten Days (1955) - Der Riese, ein SS-Mann
 The Doctor's Secret (1955) - Inspektor Bergmann
 Heimatland (1955) - Loisl, ein Holzknecht
 The Congress Dances (1955)
 Mozart (1955) - Gerl, Darsteller des Sarasto
 Die Wirtin zur Goldenen Krone (1955)
 Sonnenschein und Wolkenbruch (1955)
 Bademeister Spargel (1956)
 …und wer küßt mich? (1956) - Kesson Filmregisseur
 Rosmarie kommt aus Wildwest (1956)
 Emperor's Ball (1956) - Kriminalkommissär
 Roter Mohn (1956) - Tankwart (uncredited)
 Das Hirtenlied vom Kaisertal (1956) - Ein Chauffeur
 The Winemaker of Langenlois (1956) - Rottenwieser, Barbesitzer
 Unter Achtzehn (1957)
 Vier Mädel aus der Wachau (1957)
 The King of Bernina (1957) - Musiker (uncredited)
 Heimweh... dort wo die Blumen blüh'n (1957) - Hotelportier
 Scandal in Bad Ischl (1957) - Podlasni
 El Hakim (1957) - Basch Tamargy
 Almenrausch and Edelweiss (1957) - Filmproduzent (uncreidted)
 Lachendes Wien (1957) - Ein Berliner
 Wenn die Bombe platzt (1958) - Grotinger, Kriminalinspektor
 Der Page vom Palast-Hotel (1958)
 Endangered Girls (1958) - Schiffskapitän
 Wiener Luft (1958)
 Solang' die Sterne glüh'n (1958) - Lokalbesitzer
 Im Prater blüh'n wieder die Bäume (1958)
 Ooh... diese Ferien (1958) - Italienischer kellner (uncredited)
 The Street (1958)
 Love, Girls and Soldiers (1958) - Kolomann, Rekturt
 Frauensee (1958)
 Gräfin Mariza (1958) - Istwan - Kolomans Freund
 So ein Millionär hat's schwer (1958) - Motorradpolizist
 Der Priester und das Mädchen (1958)
 Eva (1959) - Mann mit Bart (uncredited)
 Mikosch of the Secret Service (1959) - Gefreiter
 Auf allen Straßen (1959) - Kartenspieler
 Das Nachtlokal zum Silbermond (1959) - Hakim
 Girls for the Mambo-Bar (1959)
 Die unvollkommene Ehe (1959) - Karl Linnegger - Straßenbahnschaffner
 Ich bin kein Casanova (1959) - Butler (uncredited)
 Traumrevue (1959) - Oberkellner
 Twelve Girls and One Man (1959) - Gentleman-Schorschi
 I'm Marrying the Director (1960) - Kellner im Hotel
 My Niece Doesn't Do That (1960) - Gangster #2
 Crime Tango (1960) - Dr. Roeder
 The Good Soldier Schweik (1960) - Feldwebel (uncredited)
 Glocken läuten überall (1960) - Der Bürgermeister
 The White Horse Inn (1960) - Feuerwehrhauptmann
 The Adventures of Count Bobby (1961) - Barkeeper (uncredited)
 The Secret Ways (1961) - Miklos Terenyi - Special Agent
 ...und du, mein Schatz, bleibst hier (1961)
 Das Mädchen auf der Titelseite (1961) - Alois, Jägerbursche
 Mann im Schatten (1961) - Weber
 Mariandl (1961)
 Ein Stern fällt vom Himmel (1961) - Fernand
 Season in Salzburg (1961) - Inspektor
 Im schwarzen Rössl (1961) - Anton, Hausknecht
 Schlagerrevue 1962 (1961)
 Drei Liebesbriefe aus Tirol (1962) - Assistent beim Sängerwettbewerb
 The Sweet Life of Count Bobby (1962) - Ein Herr im Zug (uncredited)
 The Elusive Corporal (1962) - Disciplinary camp officer commanding humiliating exercises (uncredited)
 Lulu (1962) - Nachtclubbesucher (uncredited)
 Das ist die Liebe der Matrosen (1962) - Oberbootsmaat Zauck
 Waldrausch (1962) - Der Lange
 Ohne Krimi geht die Mimi nie ins Bett (1962) - Polizeikommandant Pepe
 ...und ewig knallen die Räuber (1962) - Der Fuhrmann
 The Forester's Daughter (1962) - Hütl
 Der Unsichtbare (1963)
 The Model Boy (1963) - Werkmeister Anton
 The Black Cobra (1963) - Martinez Manuzzo
 Maskenball bei Scotland Yard - Die Geschichte einer unglaublichen Erfindung (1963) - Herr Funke
 Das große Liebesspiel (1963) - Mann an der Bar rechts vom Architekten (uncredited)
 Hochzeit am Neusiedlersee (1963) - Manager Otto Pfeffer
 Schweik's Awkward Years (1964) - Stabsarzt (uncredited)
 Die ganze Welt ist himmelblau (1964) - Herr Havranek
 Help, My Bride Steals (1964) - Wirt
 I Learned It from Father (1964) - Polizist (uncredited)
 The World Revolves Around You (1964) - Schädler (uncredited)
 Die große Kür (1964) - Barkeeper (uncredited)
 Happy-End am Wörthersee (1964) - Somerset
 Liebesgrüße aus Tirol (1964) - Campingausstatter (uncredited)
 In Bed by Eight (1965) - Schaffner (uncredited)
 The Great Race (1965) - Mayor-Domo (uncredited)
 Call of the Forest (1965) - Zingerl
 Der Kongreß amüsiert sich (1966) - King of Prussia (uncredited)
 Killer's Carnival (1966) - Doorman (Vienna segment) (uncredited)
 To Skin a Spy (1966) - Driver of the car that kills Wolf (uncredited)
 Happy End am Wolfgangsee (1966) - Chefrezeptionist Schwab
 Spukschloß im Salzkammergut (1966) - Otto Pfeffer
 Spy Today, Die Tomorrow (1967) - Masseur
 Das große Glück (1967) - Owner of Tivoli Bar
 The Sweet Sins of Sexy Susan (1967) - Sergeant
 Paradies der flotten Sünder (1967) - Chauffeur Franz (episode 'Wohnung zu vermieten') (uncredited)
 Why Did I Ever Say Yes Twice? (1969) - Raimondo (uncredited)
 Come to Vienna, I'll Show You Something! (1970) - Caféhaus-Gast (uncredited)
 When the Mad Aunts Arrive (1970) - Page Beppo
 Keine Angst Liebling, ich pass schon auf (1970)
 Unsere Pauker gehen in die Luft (1970) - Herr Mader
 Who Laughs Last, Laughs Best (1971) - Leopold
 Das haut den stärksten Zwilling um (1971) - Krankenpfleger
 Immer die verflixten Weiber (1971) - Apotheker
 Tante Trude aus Buxtehude (1971) - Oskar
 The Vampire Happening (1971) - Graf Bernhard Ochsenstein
 Holidays in Tyrol (1971) - Dr. Türk
 Eye of the Spider (1971) - Viennese Police Chief at Phone (uncredited)
 Rudi, Behave! (1971) - Pförtner
 Außer Rand und Band am Wolfgangsee (1972) - Franz
 Die lustigen Vier von der Tankstelle (1972) - Arthur Scholz
 The Salzburg Connection (1972) - Large Man
 Trouble with Trixie (1972)
 The Countess Died of Laughter (1973) - Osmin
 Geh, zieh dein Dirndl aus (1973) - Wirt
 Der Abituriententag (1974)
 Ach jodel mir noch einen (1974) - Johann Berger
 Wenn Mädchen zum Manöver blasen (1975) - Oberstabsarzt

References

Bibliography
 Silberman, Marc. German Cinema: Texts in Context. Wayne State University Press, 1995.

External links

1919 births
1974 deaths
Austrian male film actors
Male actors from Vienna